Andrea Riccio (died 1515) was a Roman Catholic prelate who served as Bishop of Telese o Cerreto Sannita (1505–1515).

Biography
On 24 October 1505, Andrea Riccio was appointed during the papacy of Pope Julius II as Bishop of Telese o Cerreto Sannita.
He served as Bishop of Telese o Cerreto Sannita until his death in 1515.

References

External links and additional sources
 (Chronology of Bishops) 
 (Chronology of Bishops) 

16th-century Italian Roman Catholic bishops
Bishops appointed by Pope Julius II
1515 deaths